Helene Hegemann (born 19 February 1992 in Freiburg im Breisgau) is a German writer, director, and actress. As a young writer her work was highly praised,
but her first novel, Axolotl Roadkill, sparked  a plagiarism controversy. The book has since been translated in various languages.

Life
She was raised by her divorced mother, a graphic artist and painter.  After her mother's death, Hegemann moved in with her father.
She began writing and first gained attention with her blog. On 6 December 2007, her play, Ariel 15 premiered in Berlin at Ballhaus Ost, directed by Sebastian Mauksch.
Hegemann called her play a literary fairy tale piece.
Deutschland Radio adapted it as a radio drama in 2008.
That same year, a screenplay she wrote at 14 was developed. It was underwritten by the Federal Cultural Foundation.
The resulting film, Torpedo, a youth drama, premiered in 2008 at the Hof International Film Festival and ran in German cinemas in summer 2009. It won the Max Ophüls Prize. Hegemann credits the Jean-Luc Godard film Weekend as a major influence on her writing style.

In 2009, Hegemann played a role in the episodic film Germany 09, by Nicolette Krebitz. Hegemann appeared in the segment "Die Unvollendete", where Ulrike Meinhof and Susan Sontag meet.

Hegemann lives in Berlin with her partner Andrea Hanna Hünniger and studies at a high school for non-traditional students.

In 2013, her second novel Jage zwei Tiger and in 2018 the third novel Bungalow were published.

Works

Books
Axolotl Roadkill, Ullstein, 22 January 2010, 
Axolotl Roadkill / druk 1, Translator Marcel Misset, Arbeiderspers, 2010, 
Roadkill, Translator I. Amico Di Meane, Einaudi, 2010, 
Axolotl Roadkill, Constable & Robinson Limited, 2012, 
Jage zwei Tiger, Hanser, 26 August 2013, 
Bungalow, Hanser, Berlin 2018,

Movies
 Torpedo 2008, (Director, Writer) 
 Axolotl Overkill 2017 (Director, Writer)

See also
 List of female film and television directors
 List of lesbian filmmakers
 List of LGBT-related films directed by women

References

Further reading
Daniel Stich, Axolotl Roadkill und die Plagiatsdebatte: Welche erzählerische Funktion haben die unausgewiesenen Zitate im Roman Helene Hegemanns?, GRIN Verlag, 2011, 

1992 births
German lesbian actresses
German lesbian writers
German women novelists
Writers from Freiburg im Breisgau
Living people
German LGBT novelists
People involved in plagiarism controversies
21st-century German novelists
21st-century German women writers
Lesbian novelists
Actors from Freiburg im Breisgau
Film people from Freiburg im Breisgau